Nickel (III) oxide is the inorganic compound with the formula Ni2O3. It is not well characterized, and is sometimes referred to as black nickel oxide. Traces of Ni2O3 on nickel surfaces have been mentioned.

Nickel (III) oxide has been studied theoretically since the early thirties, supporting its unstable nature at standard temperatures. A nanostructured pure phase of the material was synthesized and stabilized for the first time in 2015 from the reaction of nickel(II) nitrate]] with sodium hypochlorite and characterized using powder X-ray diffraction and electron microscopy.

References

Inorganic compounds
Catalysts
Electrochemistry
Transition metal oxides
Nickel compounds
Non-stoichiometric compounds
Sesquioxides